Marilyn (Vanitas) is an oil over acrylic on canvas painting by Audrey Flack executed in 1977. It has the dimensions of 96 x 96 inches. This contemporary piece is part of a collection Flack compiled titled Vanitas. It focuses heavily on an intensely colored, realistic presentation, symbolism dating back to historical work, formal sources, and historical context. The work is in the collection of the University of Arizona Museum of Art.

Formal Aspects
An opened book page with a photograph of the icon Marilyn Monroe is the focal point of Flack’s piece.  This is one of the few objects without intense coloration, however the high contrast of black and white unifies it with the surrounding. Most shapes in the piece are curved and rounded, however a sepia-toned, squared photograph lies on top of the text of the book. Unlike the grown woman illustrated on the page, two children are shown in this photo.

Symbolism
Josephine Withers describes Flack’s attention to precise details: “If these objects, which are an intimate part of her own life, seem rich, sensuous, and precious, it is because Flack herself has invested them with those qualities.”  The objects surrounding Marilyn include a rose, fruit which is both whole and cut, a calendar, an hourglass, a pocket watch, a drinking glass, pearls, paint pots, a mirror, a candle, cosmetics, a photograph, and wrinkled cloth, which the objects rest upon. These objects in nature and color come across as feminine, reflecting Marilyn’s public persona.  Many of the objects are reflective and Flack made a point to include visible shine on them. Two mirrors are shown, emphasizing this – one of which reflects Marilyn’s face.

Similar Work
A piece which Flack may have drawn inspiration from is David Bailly’s Vanitas Still Life with Portrait of a Young Painter. Like Flack’s work, Bailly incorporates symbols such as flowers, portraits, candles, books, hourglasses, glasses, and jewelry.

Iconography
Flack seemed to identify with the ideals of feminine behavior and presence, which Marilyn Monroe was expected to possess. The symbols of beauty are more obvious as they take the form of cosmetics and flowers. Likewise, the pocket watch, hourglass, and calendar refer to the passage of time straight-forwardly. The fruit and flowers also symbolize time in that they will decompose. The discolored photograph pictured is outdated compared to its surroundings, which implies time passage as well. The depiction of a candle may be in reference to the religious roots of the memento mori, creating a scene similar to an altar piece.
Marilyn Monroe remains an American icon, reaching height as she performed for soldiers in Korea in 1954.

Notes

References
 Baskind, Samantha, "“Everybody Thought I Was Catholic: Audrey Flack’s Jewish Identity." American Art 23, no. 1 (2009): 104-15.
 Josephine Withers, "Monumental Still Lives." Feminist Studies 6, no. 3 (1980): 524-29. 
 Fine, Elsa Honig, "One Point Perspective." Woman's Art Journal 15, no. 1 (1994): 2.
 Hauser, Katherine, "Audrey Flack's Still Lifes: Between Femininity and Feminism." Woman's Art Journal 22, no. 2 (2001): 26-1.
 Schlegel, Ursula. “Observations on Masaccio’s Trinity Fresco in Santa Maria Novella,” The Art Bulletin 45, no.1 (Mar., 1963): 19-33.
 Good, Kristi. “Marilyn Monroe.” Theatre History Studies 33 (1954): 209-225.

American paintings
1977 paintings